Elizabeth Jane Kelsbie (born 4 October 1966) is an Australian politician. She has been an Australian Labor Party member of the Western Australian Legislative Assembly for the electoral district of Warren-Blackwood since 2021.

Prior to entering politics, Kelsbie was the chief executive of employment organisation Worklink WA, the first female president of the Denmark Surf Livesaving Club between 2016 and 2019 and a board member of the Denmark Chamber of Commerce.

She won her seat at the 2021 Western Australian state election with a 14.3% swing against the incumbent National Party candidate. Kelsbie defeated the former leader of the WA Nationals, Terry Redman.

In September 2021, Kelsbie declared her support in parliament for the McGowan Government's decision to bring an end to the native timber forestry industry.

References 

Living people
1966 births
Australian Labor Party members of the Parliament of Western Australia
Members of the Western Australian Legislative Assembly
Women members of the Western Australian Legislative Assembly
21st-century Australian politicians
21st-century Australian women politicians